Home  is Cantopop artist Miriam Yeung's seventh EP album. It was released by Capital Artists on 7 October 2010.

The album includes five new songs, two of which were featured in her movies: Love in a Puff and  Perfect Wedding. The album also included four music videos.

Track listing
 呼吸需要 (Breathing Needs—Song in Love in a Puff)
 斗零踭 (High Heels)
 飲酒思源2.0 (When Drinking Wine, Remember Its Origin version 2)
 初見 (First Sight—Song in Perfect Wedding)
 我係我 (I Am Me)

Music videos
 呼吸需要 (Breathing Needs) MV
 斗零踭 (High Heels) MV
 飲酒思源2.0 (When Drinking Wine, Remember Its Origin version 2) MV
 初見 (First Sight) MV

Awards and Recognitions

References

2010 EPs
Miriam Yeung albums